Gerd Binnig (born 20 July 1947) is a German physicist. He is most famous for having won the Nobel Prize in Physics jointly with Heinrich Rohrer in 1986 for the invention of the scanning tunneling microscope.

Early life and education
Binnig was born in Frankfurt am Main and played in the ruins of the city during his childhood. His family lived partly in Frankfurt and partly in Offenbach am Main, and he attended school in both cities. At the age of 10, he decided to become a physicist, but he soon wondered whether he had made the right choice. He concentrated more on music, playing in a band. He also started playing the violin at 15 and played in his school orchestra.

Binnig studied physics at the J.W. Goethe University in Frankfurt, gaining a bachelor's degree in 1973 and remaining there to do a PhD with in Werner Martienssen's group, supervised by Eckhardt Hoenig.

Career
In 1978, Binnig accepted an offer from IBM to join their Zürich research group, where he worked with Heinrich Rohrer, Christoph Gerber and Edmund Weibel. There they developed the scanning tunneling microscope (STM), an instrument for imaging surfaces at the atomic level.
The Nobel committee described the effect that the invention of the STM had on science, saying that "entirely new fields are opening up for the study of the structure of matter."  The physical principles on which the STM was based were already known before the IBM team developed the STM, but Binnig and his colleagues were the first to solve the significant experimental challenges involved in putting it into effect.

The IBM Zürich team were soon recognized with a number of prizes: the German Physics Prize, the Otto Klung Prize, the Hewlett Packard Prize and the King Faisal Prize. 
In 1986, Binnig and Rohrer shared half of the Nobel Prize in Physics, the other half of the Prize was awarded to Ernst Ruska.

From 1985–1988, he worked in California. He was at IBM in Almaden Valley, and was visiting professor at Stanford University.

In 1985, Binnig invented the atomic force microscope (AFM) and Binnig, Christoph Gerber and Calvin Quate went on to develop a working version of this new microscope for insulating surfaces.

In 1987 Binnig was appointed IBM Fellow. In the same year, he started the IBM Physics group Munich, working on creativity. and atomic force microscopy. 

In 1994 Professor Gerd Binnig founded Definiens which turned in the year 2000 into a commercial enterprise. The company developed Cognition Network Technology to analyze images just like the human eye and brain are capable of doing.

in 2016, Binnig won the Kavli Prize in Nanoscience. He became a fellow of the Norwegian Academy of Science and Letters.

The Binnig and Rohrer Nanotechnology Center, an IBM-owned research facility in Rüschlikon, Zürich is named after Gerd Binnig and Heinrich Rohrer.

Personal life
In 1969, Binnig married Lore Wagler, a psychologist, and they have a daughter born in Switzerland and a son born in California. His hobbies include reading, swimming, and golf.

References

External links

 Pioneers in Electricity and Magnetism – Gerd Binnig National High Magnetic Field Laboratory
  including the Nobel Lecture, 8 December 1986 Scanning Tunneling Microscopy – From Birth to Adolescence
 Astra Zeneca acquires Definiens

1947 births
Living people
Experimental physicists
German Nobel laureates
20th-century German inventors
20th-century German physicists
Scientists from Frankfurt
Nobel laureates in Physics
Ludwig Maximilian University of Munich alumni
Microscopists
Foreign associates of the National Academy of Sciences
IBM employees
IBM Fellows
Goethe University Frankfurt alumni
Grand Crosses with Star and Sash of the Order of Merit of the Federal Republic of Germany
Members of the Norwegian Academy of Science and Letters
Kavli Prize laureates in Nanoscience
21st-century German physicists